Shyampur is a Thana of Dhaka Metropolitan Police in Bangladesh.

Geography
Its total area is 2.31 km2.

Demographics
This Shyampur has a population of 60152. Males constitute 49.78% of the population, and females 50.22%. Shyampur has an average literacy rate of 52.68%, and the national average of 32.4% literate. Famous persons in shyampur are Toufiq and Tisha.

Administration

Shyampur has 1 Unions/Wards, 7 Mauzas/Mahallas, and 3 villages.

See also
Upazilas of Bangladesh
Districts of Bangladesh
Divisions of Bangladesh

References

Thanas of Dhaka